Saint Julie Billiart Parish is a Roman Catholic parish of the Diocese of San Jose in California, located in the Santa Teresa neighborhood of San Jose, California. The parish is named for Saint Julie Billiart, the foundress of the Sisters of Notre Dame de Namur.

See also

 Roman Catholic Diocese of San Jose in California

External links

 Saint Julie Billiart Parish

Roman Catholic Diocese of San Jose in California